Dennis Allan Lick (born April 26, 1954) is a former American football offensive tackle for the Chicago Bears.  Lick played six seasons with the Bears from 1976 to 1981.  He was signed out of the  University of Wisconsin–Madison.

Lick attended St. Rita High School on Chicago's south side and resides in the Clearing neighborhood.  He shares a distinction with two other NFL players that have also attended both St. Rita and the University of Wisconsin–Madison, Tony Simmons and Ahmad Merritt (Merritt also has played for the Bears).

References

1954 births
Living people
All-American college football players
American football offensive tackles
Chicago Bears players
Players of American football from Chicago
Wisconsin Badgers football players